The Curtiss YP-20 was an American biplane fighter project developed by Curtiss for the United States Army Air Service.

Design and development
In 1929, three Curtiss P-11 Hawks were ordered with 600 hp (447 kW) Curtiss H-1640 Chieftain engines. These proved a failure, and before completion, the third was converted to use a 9-cylinder 575 hp (429 kW) Wright Cyclone, being completed as the YP-20. Testing with the R1820 was prolonged, so the Army's intention to promptly switch to a Curtiss V-1570 Conqueror engine and redesignate the aircraft XP-22 was dropped; another P-11 was chosen for that instead.

Except for the engine change and its Townend ring cowling, the YP-20 was not drastically different from the P-6 from which both it and the P-11 derived, though the YP-20 had more fin and less rudder area, and featured a steerable tailwheel, rather than the original skid. Later, a crankcase cover, gear strut fairings, and wheel pants were added.

In June 1931, the AAC held a competition to evaluate the P-6, P-12, XP-22, and YP-20. The XP-22 came out the winner, but the YP-20 was given a nose and landing gear graft from the XP-22, becoming the XP-6E (P-6E prototype). With the addition of a supercharger and an enclosed cockpit, it was tested as the XP-6F.

Operators

United States Army Air Service

Specifications (original YP-20)

References

Further reading
Fitzsimons, Bernard, ed. Illustrated Encyclopedia of Weapons and Warfare. Volume 12, pp. 1255–6, "Hawk, Curtiss Models 34 and 35 (P-1 to P-6 and F6C". London: Phoebus Publishing, 1978.
Donald, David, ed. Encyclopedia of World Aircraft. Etobicoke, ON: Prospero Books, 1997.
Jones, Lloyd S. U.S. Fighters. Fallbrook, CA: Aero Publishers, 1975.

Curtiss P-20
P-20
Single-engined tractor aircraft
Biplanes